George Lewis Becke (or Louis Becke; 18 June 1855 – 18 February 1913) was at the turn of the nineteenth century, the most prolific, significant, and internationally renowned Australian-born writer of the South Pacific region. Having lived and worked among Pacific Islands and Islanders as a trader, ship's supercargo, and villager for some two decades, learning languages and observing natural and cultural life, Becke was prompted by J F Archibald of The Bulletin to write down his experiences, eventually becoming a popular and respected author of short stories, novellas, novels, as well as historic and ethnographic works.

Early life
Becke was born at Port Macquarie, New South Wales, son of Frederick Becke, Clerk of Petty Sessions and his wife Caroline Matilda, née Beilby. Both parents were born in England. The ninth of twelve children, the young Becke found walking the coastal headlands and beaches of his region, often in the company of local Australian Aboriginal people, along with sailing the local waters, much more interesting than formal schooling. However, the family moved to Hunters Hill, Sydney in 1867 and Becke was further educated at Fort Street High School, although he still preferred to go fishing.

In 1869, Becke travelled to San Francisco with his brother William Vernon and was away for nineteen months. At 16 years of age, Becke was a stowaway on a ship bound for Samoa. In Apia he took a job as a book-keeper in the store of Mrs Mary Mcfarlane which he held until some time after December 1872. Under orders of Mrs Mcfarlane, Becke sailed a ketch, the E.A. Williams to Mili Atoll to deliver it to William "Bully" Hayes, the notorious blackbirder.  Beck arrived at Mili Atoll on 17 January 1874. Becke remained as a passenger on the Leonora, until the ship was wrecked on 15 March 1874 during a storm while in Lele harbour at Kosrae. It was seven months until HMS Rosario rescued Becke and the others. Becke was later arrested for piracy, but was acquitted in Brisbane at age 19. Then he tried his luck at the Palmer River goldrush, was employed at Ravenswood station and from 1878–79 worked as a bank clerk in Townsville, Queensland. The story Nell of Mulliner's Camp is set in a mining camp in North Queensland.

From about April 1880 Becke was in the Ellice Islands (now Tuvalu) working with the Liverpool firm of John S. de Wolf and Co. on Nanumanga until the trading-station was destroyed later that year in a cyclone. In February 1881 he opened his own store in Nukufetau, where he married Nelea Tikena. The stories that Louis Becke set in the Ellice Islands are: The Fisher Folk of Nukufetau that describes a fishing expedition, The Rangers of the Tia Kau that describes a shark attack at the Tia Kau reef between Nanumea and Nanumanga, and Kennedy the Boatsteerer that describes an attempt by a trader on Niutao to escape with a woman betrothed to a Niutaon chief, which ends in tragedy.

Later in 1881 a shipwreck on Beru Island in the Gilbert Islands caused him to lose all he had; Becke then worked in New Britain and was in Majuro by November 1882. For the next ten years Becke moved about the Gilbert Islands, Ellice Islands, Caroline Islands and Marshall Islands acquiring a knowledge of the customs and beliefs of the islanders and meeting palagi traders and beachcombers that Becke later used his stories.

Becke wrote about Bully Hayes in The Strange Adventures of James Shervinton and other stories: Captain "Bully" Hayes; Concerning "Bully" Hayes; The Wreck Of The Leonora: A Memory Of "Bully" Hayes. However these stories must be read with caution as the line between fact and fiction-writing is unclear. Becke's experiences in the Pacific provided most of the material for Becke's stories.

Becke's earliest writing on Hayes was published, without attribution to Becke, in the novel A Modern Buccaneer (1894), which was published by Thomas Alexander Browne under the pseudonym 'Rolf Boldrewood'.  Browne was the author of Robbery Under Arms and paid Becke for his recollections of "Bully" Hayes. Following publication of A Modern Buccaneer, Becke wrote to Browne protesting at the use of his manuscript without any significant change, and without attribution of Becke's contribution of the manuscript.

Becke returned to New South Wales late in 1885 and on 10 February 1886 married Mary Elizabeth (Bessie) Maunsell, the daughter of Colonel Maunsell, of Port Macquarie. On 9 November 1888 his daughter, Nora Lois, was born.

On 9 June 1896 he left Sydney for London with Nora Lois and Miss Fanny Sabrina Long.  Becke and Fanny Long had 2 daughters, Alrema (born 30 October 1897) and Niya (born 27 September 1898). Bessie obtained a divorce on the grounds of desertion on 29 October 1903.

In 1908 he and his family went to Auckland, New Zealand, via Fiji; then in 1909 the family travelled to Sydney, Australia.

On 7 September 1910 he was elected a member of the Royal Society of New South Wales.

He died on 18 February 1913 at the Hotel York in Sydney and was buried in the Waverley Cemetery near to the graves of Henry Lawson and Henry Kendall.

Literary career

In January 1892 Becke returned to Sydney and persuaded by Ernest Favenc and J. F. Archibald began to contribute stories to The Bulletin, the first of which was Tis in the Blood appearing in the edition of 6 May 1893. A collection of these stories, By Reef and Palm, was published in England in 1894; His Native Wife, a novelette, was published in Australia in 1895; followed by a further collection of stories, The Ebbing of the Tide, which was published in 1896.

Becke went to London about the beginning of 1896, helped by Archibald and William Macleod of The Bulletin who advanced him the sum of £200, and he remained in Europe for around 15 years, during which time a large number of collections of short stories and a few novels and stories for boys were published.

Becke was fairly paid by the magazines for his stories, but his books were always sold outright and never on a royalty basis, he was not a wealthy man.

His writings were of variable quality, but have been compared to Rudyard Kipling, Herman Melville, Joseph Conrad and Robert Louis Stevenson.

Late life and legacy
Becke was in Sydney again in the middle of 1909 and died of cancer there on 18 February 1913, working up until his death. About 30 of Becke's books are listed in E. Morris Miller's Australian Literature with six other volumes written in collaboration with Walter J. Jeffrey. He was survived by his wife and a daughter.

Becke had said that any literary success he had achieved was due entirely to the training received from the editor of The Bulletin, J. F. Archibald, "who taught me the secrets of condensation and simplicity of language" Once having learned this, Becke had a wealth of experience to draw upon and, though there was inevitably some monotony of theme, he wrote a very large number of stories that can still be read with interest, and show him to have been a writer of considerable ability.By Reef and Palm and Ebbing of the Tide received both good reviews and strong sales; with By Reef and Palm going through seven reprints between 1894 and 1924. Almost all of Becke's works were published in America by J. B. Lippincott of Philadelphia. Becke was criticised by some reviewers for lapses in grammar and taste. His Native Wife was unfavourably received in America because of its subject matter; J. B. Lippincott also refused to publish The Mutineer: A Romance of Pitcairn Island.

WorksBy Reef and Palm (Unwin, 1894) collection of stories:Challis the Doubter 
'''Tis in the Blood 
The Revenge of Macy O'Shea 
The Rangers of the Tia Kau 
Pallou's Tāloi 
A Basket of Breadfruit
Enderby's Courtship
Long Charley's Good Little Wife
The Methodical Mr. Burr of Majura
A Truly Great Man
The Doctor's Wife 
The Fate of the "Alida"
The Chilian Blue Jacket
Brantley of Vahitahi

Ebbing of the Tide (Unwin, 1895) collection of stories:
Luliban of the Pool
Ninia
Baldwin's Loisé
At the Kava-Drinking
Mrs. Liardet: A South Sea Trading Episode
Kennedy the Boatsteerer
A Dead Loss
Hickson: A Half-Caste
A Boating Party of Two
The Best Asset in a Fool's Estate
Deschard of Oneaka
Nell of Mulliner's Camp
Auriki Reef
At the Ebbing of the Tide
The Fallacies of Hilliard
A Tale of a Mask
The Cook of the "Spreetoo Santoo"
Lupton's Guest: A Memory of the Eastern Pacific
In Nouméa
The Feast at Pentecost
An Honour to the Service

Besides those mentioned above, his works include:
His Native Wife (Alex Lindsay, 1895; Unwin, 1896)
Pacific Tales (Unwin, 1897)
Wild Life in South Seas (Unwin, 1897)
Rodman the Boat-steerer and Other Stories (Unwin, 1898)
Ridan the Devil and Other Stories (Unwin, 1899)
Tom Wallis, a Tale of the South Seas (Unwin, 1900)
Edward Barry, South Seas Pearler (Unwin, 1900)
Tessa, the Trader's Wife (Unwin, 1901)
By Rock and Pool on an Austral Shore (Unwin, 1901)
York the Adventurer and Other Stories (Unwin, 1901)
Breachley, Black Sheep (Unwin, 1902)
The Strange Adventure of James Shervinton and Other Stories (Unwin, 1902)
The Jalasco Brig (Unwin, 1902)
Helen Adair (Unwin, 1903)
Chinkie's Flat and Other Stories (Unwin, 1903)
Tom Gerard (Unwin, 1904)
Under Tropic Skies (Unwin, 1905)
Notes from My South-Sea Log (T Werner Laurie, 1901)
The Adventures of a Supercargo (Unwin, 1906)
Sketches from Normandy (T Werner Laurie, 1906)
The Settlers of Karossa Creek and Other Stories of Australian Bush Life (Religious Tract Society, 1907)
The Call of the South (John Milne, 1908)
The Pearl Divers of Roncador Reef (James Clarke & Co, 1908)
The Adventures of Louis Blake (T Werner Laurie, 1909)Neath Austral Skies (John Milne, 1908)Bully Hayes: Buccaneer and Other Stories (NSW Bookstall Co Ltd, 1913) Illustrated by Norman Lindsay

 Works co-authored with Walter J. Jeffrey A First Fleet Family (Unwin, 1896)The Mystery of the Laughlin Isles (Unwin, 1896)The Mutineer: A Romance of Pitcairn Island (Unwin, 1898)The Naval Pioneers of Australia (John Murray, 1899)Admiral Philip: The Founding of New South Wales (Unwin, 1899)The Tapir of Banderah and Other Stories (C. Arthur Pearson, 1901)

References

Further reading
 Day, A. Grove (1967). Louis Becke. Melbourne: Hill of Content. The pioneering biography, including the first complete bibliography of his writings and criticism of his works.
Sally O'Neill, 'Becke, George Lewis (Louis) (1855–1913)', Australian Dictionary of Biography'', Volume 7, Melbourne University Press, 1979, pp 238–239.

External links

Dirk HR Spennemann (2000). Louis Becke (1859–1913). A biography.
 
 
 Works by Louis Becke at Project Gutenberg Australia
 
 
Bibliographic details of Becke's works.

Archival holdings
Louis Becke (George Louis Becke), Papers 1880-1905, State Library of New South Wales, A 1372/vols. 1-2 , A 1373 , A 1374 , A 1391 , A 1807
Louis Becke (George Louis Becke), Papers 1880-1913, State Library of New South Wales, MLMSS 248
Louis Becke (George Louis Becke), Papers 1881-1912, State Library of New South Wales, Safe 1/8

1855 births
1913 deaths
19th-century Australian novelists
20th-century Australian novelists
Australian male novelists
Australian people of English descent
Australian male short story writers
History of Tuvalu
History of Kiribati
Oceania in fiction
19th-century Australian short story writers
19th-century male writers
20th-century Australian short story writers
20th-century Australian male writers
Australian sailors
Beachcombers
Maritime writers
People from Port Macquarie